Two vessels of the Royal Australian Navy have been named HMAS Fremantle for the city of Fremantle, Western Australia:

, a Bathurst-class corvette launched in 1943 and decommissioned in 1959
, a Fremantle-class patrol boat commissioned in 1980 and decommissioned in 2006

Battle honours
Ships named HMAS Fremantle are entitled to carry two battle honours:
 Darwin 1943
 Pacific 1943–45

References

Royal Australian Navy ship names